Nikulinskaya is a rural locality (a village) in Lipetskoye Rural Settlement, Verkhovazhsky District, Vologda Oblast, Russia. The population was 31 as of 2002.

Geography 
Nikulinskaya is located 52 km southwest of Verkhovazhye (the district's administrative centre) by road. Kostyuninskaya is the nearest rural locality.

References 

Rural localities in Verkhovazhsky District